Timothy Antoine is the Governor of the Eastern Caribbean Central Bank.

References

Living people
Central bankers
University of the West Indies alumni
Alumni of the London School of Economics
Year of birth missing (living people)